Cerete is a comune (municipality) in the Province of Bergamo in the Italian region of Lombardy, located about  northeast of Milan and about  northeast of Bergamo.   

Cerete borders the following municipalities: Bossico, Gandino, Rovetta, Songavazzo, Sovere.

References

External links
 Official website